"Show 'Em (What You're Made Of)" is a song by American pop group Backstreet Boys from their eighth studio album In a World Like This. It was released as the second single from the album on November 18, 2013. The song was written by Morgan Taylor Reid, Mika Guillory, and Backstreet Boys members AJ McLean and Kevin Richardson.

It is also the theme song of the documentary film Backstreet Boys: Show 'Em What You're Made Of, and was featured in the German movie  soundtrack.

Background and recording 

Richardson got the inspiration for the title of the song from his late father's words. The song was co-written by bandmate AJ McLean and is meant to be a pep talk for their children, and also as a positive reinforcement for the world in general. "This is as a positive reinforcement-type song because there’s so much negativity out there. The world needs positivity! The song turned out beyond what we ever expected. It became this huge emotional record," McLean said.

Music video 
A music video for the song, directed by Jon Vulpine, was filmed in Miami, Florida. It was premiered on the group's official Facebook page and then released on Vevo a day later.

The video takes on a minimalistic approach, showing individual shots of each band member against a black background. A.J. and Brian were shirtless as they were going by the theme song and show something important for them personally—a tattoo dedicated to his daughter for A.J. and a heart surgery scar for Brian. Brian had an open heart surgery in 1998 to correct a birth defect and hadn't been seen shirtless publicly ever since.

Track listing
Digital download
"Show 'Em (What You're Made Of)" – 3:44

 UK Promo CD single
"Show 'Em (What You're Made Of) (Ash Howes Radio Mix)" – 3:44
"Show 'Em (What You're Made Of) (Album Version)" – 3:47
"Show 'Em (What You're Made Of) (Morgan Taylor Reid Mix)" – 3:41

Charts

Release history

References

2010s ballads
2013 songs
2013 singles
Backstreet Boys songs
Pop ballads
Songs written by Morgan Taylor Reid